Bindii, bindi, bindyi or bindi-eye may refer to the following plant species:
 Soliva sessilis, also known as lawnweed, common soliva, and field burrweed
 Tribulus terrestris, also known as puncturevine, caltrop, cathead, goathead, and burra gokharu.
 Calotis hispidula, also known as Bogan flea.
 Alternanthera pungens, more commonly known as khaki weed.

See also 

 Bindi (disambiguation)
 Bindeez